Geraldine Aron  (born 1951) is an Irish playwright. She was born in Galway, Ireland, has lived in Zambia, Zimbabwe and South Africa, and now lives in London. 
 
Aron's first play Bar and Ger was performed at the Space Theatre in Cape Town in 1975 and then won awards and continues to be  produced internationally. 
Aron's one-hander starring Dawn French, My Brilliant Divorce, played at the Apollo Theatre in London's West End and was nominated for the 2004 Laurence Olivier Award for Best Entertainment. Twelve of Aron's plays have been performed on television or radio.

A French feature-length film, directed by Michèle Laroque, was released in France on 17 January 2018, under the title Brillantissime.

Aron's produced stage plays include Same Old Moon (Geilgud Theatre, Shaftesbury Avenue,) A Galway Girl, The Shrinking of Alby Chapman, Spider,  On The Blue Train, Olive and Hilary, The Stanley Parkers, et al.   
Aron is included in the 1992 Bloomsbury Guide to Women's Literature, and many other anthologies. My Brilliant Divorce appears in Singular Sensations, an American collection of  one-person plays.

Selected works

Plays with place and date of first production
Bar and Ger, Space Theatre, Cape Town, South Africa, 1975
A Galway Girl, Space Theatre, Cape Town, South Africa, 1979
Same Old Moon, Druid Theatre, Galway, Ireland, 1984
The Stanley Parkers, Druid Theatre, Galway, Irelandm 1990
The Donahue Sisters, Druid Theatre, Galway, Ireland, 1990
My Brilliant Divorce, Town Hall Theatre, Galway, Ireland, 2001

Publications
Seven Plays and Four Monologues, 1985  (includes Mickey Kannis Caught My Eye, Mr McConkey's Suitcase, On The Blue Train, The Shrinking of Alby Chapman, Spare Room, Spider).

References

External links
 (Interview with Aron)
(Listing at Aron's agent's website, which gives fuller list of plays and other works)

1951 births
Living people
Irish women dramatists and playwrights
People from Galway (city)
20th-century Irish dramatists and playwrights
21st-century Irish dramatists and playwrights
21st-century Irish women writers
20th-century Irish women writers